= Gibson Code =

Constructed language

The Gibson Code is a constructed language invented by Manly B. Gibson of the United States Army Coastal Artillery, which replaces words with numbers using the digits 0-9. An example is 5–111–409–10–5–516–2013 ("The boy eats the red apple").
